Sorbus amabilis, is a species of flowering plant in the family Rosaceae, is a tree to around  tall that occurs in mixed forests and on mountain slopes in eastern China. It is endemic to China and found only in Anhui, Fujian, Hubei, Jiangxi, and Zhejiang provinces. It is threatened by habitat destruction.

References

External links

amabilis
Endemic flora of China
Trees of China
Vulnerable plants
Taxonomy articles created by Polbot